Sundacossus is a genus of moths in the family Cossidae.

Species
 Sundacossus gauguini Yakovlev, 2008
 Sundacossus rinjaniensis Yakovlev & Korzeev, 2022
 Sundacossus timur Yakovlev, 2006

References

 , 2006, New Cossidae (Lepidoptera) from Asia, Africa and Macronesia, Tinea 19 (3): 188-213.
 , 2008, A new species of the genus Sundacossus Yakovlev, 2006, Atalanta 39 (1-4): 399-400.
 , 2022, Review of the genus Sundacossus Yakovlev, 2006 (Lepidoptera: Cossidae) with description of one new species from Lombok Island (Indonesia), Ecologica Montenegrina 52: 27-32.

External links
Natural History Museum Lepidoptera generic names catalog

Cossinae